Innocent Ranku is a Botswanan footballer who currently plays as a midfielder for Uniao Flamengo Santos. He played for the Botswana national football team between 1997 and 2003.

External links
 

Living people
Association football midfielders
Botswana footballers
Mochudi Centre Chiefs SC players
Botswana international footballers
Notwane F.C. players
Uniao Flamengo Santos F.C. players
Year of birth missing (living people)